187 Fac, was an American rap group from Hayward, California, with two members: Den Fenn (Alvin Dennis Thomas, Jr.) and G-Nut (Gregory Savoy Brown, Jr). After releasing their debut album, The U.N.E., in 1993, they made their first guest appearance on Ant Banks' 1995 album, Do or Die. Before releasing their second album, Fac Not Fiction on Penalty Recordings in 1997, they appeared together on several albums, including: Murder Squad Nationwide,  The Rompalation, and Have Heart Have Money.  In 1996, they appeared on the Red Hot Organization's compilation CD, America is Dying Slowly, alongside Biz Markie, Wu-Tang Clan, and Fat Joe, among many other prominent hip hop artists.  The CD, meant to raise awareness of the AIDS epidemic among African American men, was heralded as "a masterpiece" by The Source magazine.

Background 
187 Fac's second album, Fac Not Fiction, was released in 1997 and peaked at number 81 on the Billboard Top R&B/Hip-Hop Albums. It was executive produced by Spice 1 and features guest performances by Ant Banks, B-Legit, V-Dal, Big Lurch, Captain Save 'Em and Spice 1. The group then went on to appear on several Bay Area artists' albums and compilations as a group and as solo artists.

In 2000, the group changed their name to DenGee and released their final album, DenGee Livin'. It was produced entirely by E-A-Ski & CMT. Along with a single, a music video was released to promote the album, "VIP Status", and features a cameo appearance by producer E-A-Ski.

G-Nut died on 9 May 2018 at the age of 46.

Discography

Studio albums 
The U.N.E. (1993)
Fac Not Fiction (1997)
DenGee Livin' (2000)

Guest appearances

References

External links 
187 Fac at Discogs
Den Fenn at Discogs
Den Fenn on Myspace
G-Nut at Discogs
G-Nut on Myspace

Hip hop groups from California
Musical groups established in 1993
1993 establishments in California
Musical groups from the San Francisco Bay Area
People from Hayward, California
Rappers from the San Francisco Bay Area
Gangsta rap groups